Eve and the Fire Horse is a 2005 Canadian film written and directed by Julia Kwan. It won the Special Jury Prize at the Sundance Film Festival and the Claude Jutra Award for the best feature film by a first-time film director in Canada.

Plot
Eve, a precocious nine-year-old with an overactive imagination, was born in the Year of the Fire Horse, notorious among Chinese families for producing the most troublesome children. Dinners around Eve's family table are a raucous affair, where old world propriety and new world audacity mix in even measure. But as summer approaches, it seems like Eve's carefree childhood days are behind her.

When her mother chops down their apple tree — a superstitious omen — bad luck worms its way into their family in unexpected, tragic ways. Forced to grow up too fast, Eve learns to take pleasure in life's small gifts — like a goldfish she believes to be the reincarnated spirit of her beloved grandmother.

Meanwhile, Eve's older sister Karena is going through changes of her own, exploring a newfound fascination with Christianity. Soon, crucifixes pop up next to the Buddha in the family's house, and Eve must contend with a Sunday school class where her wild imagination is distinctly out of place.

Caught between her sister's quest for premature sainthood and her own sense of right and wrong, Eve faces the challenges of childhood with fanciful humor and wide-eyed wonder. Along the way, she proves that sometimes the most troublesome children are the ones that touch our hearts most deeply.

Cast

External links
 
 
 
 Erik Paulsson's Red Storm Site

2005 films
English-language Canadian films
2005 drama films
Films set in Vancouver
Best First Feature Genie and Canadian Screen Award-winning films
Canadian drama films
Films directed by Julia Kwan
Films scored by Mychael Danna
Films scored by Rob Simonsen
2005 directorial debut films
2000s Canadian films